= Simbal Camp =

Coordinates: 32°39′N 74°47′E

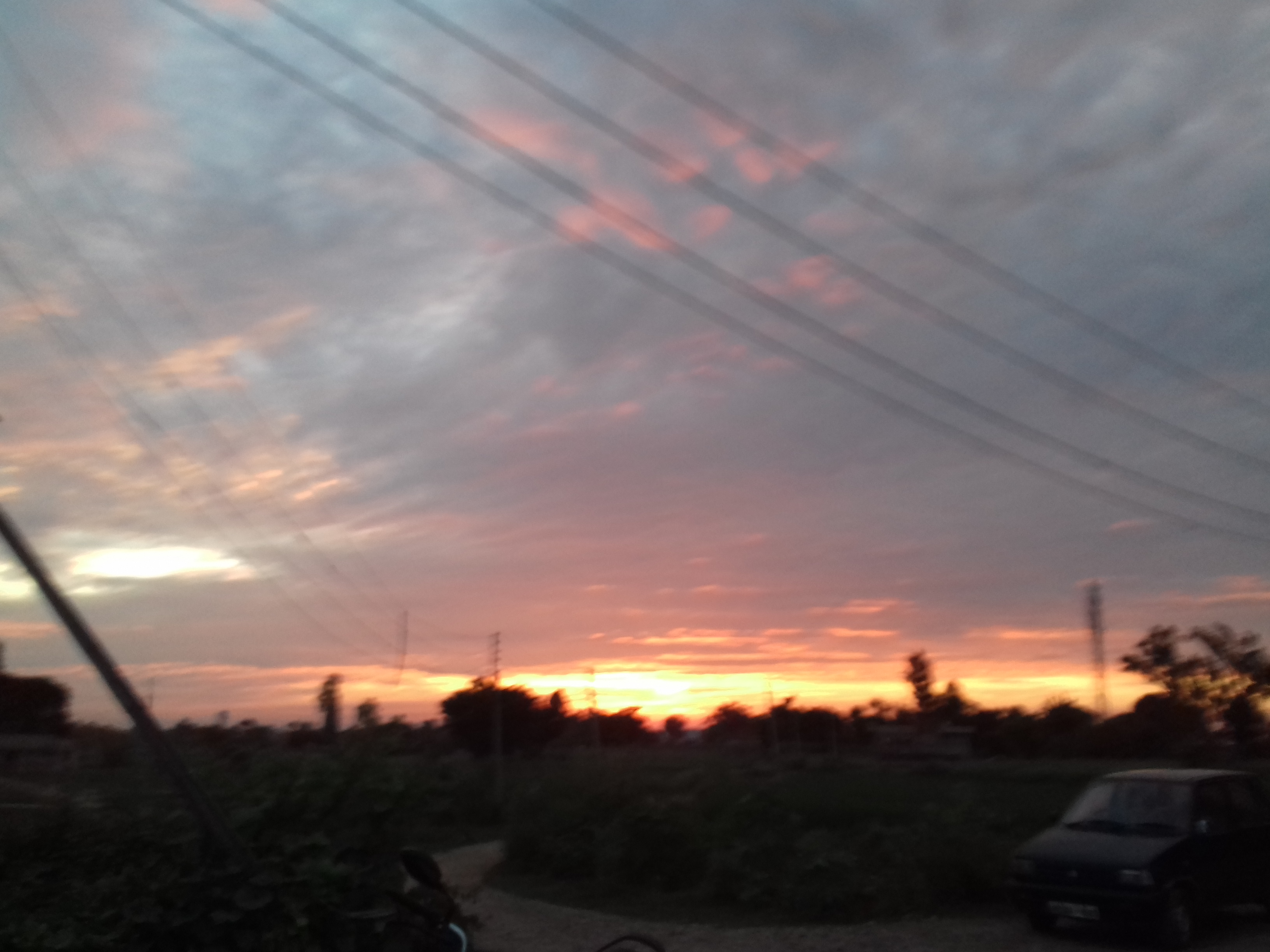

Simbal camp is located in Jammu, India, home to refugees of the 1947 partition of India. The name Simbal refers to type of tree. It's the richest town in Jammu.

== Demographics ==
98% of the camp residents are Sikh . It is the largest of the Sikh towns in the Union Territory of Jammu and Kashmir . Simbal is divided into five wards viz Ward no. 1 to 5. The most commonly spoken languages are Punjabi and Poonchi There is a 98% Literacy rate. The most common occupations are positions in the service and transport sectors. They left their home in Pakistani Administered Azad Kashmir and struggled hard for earning their livelihood during initial days after partition with no or negligible aid from Government. Simbal has two high schools, one for girls and one for boys. There is one primary health center as well with general physician and dental surgeon available on weekdays. Many Simbalites are serving in Indian Army. Every year religious gathering or Gurbani Kirtan Dewaan is organised on first weekend of June. And Nagar Kirtan is organised from Simbal on the occasion of Guru Gobind Singh Ji birthday every year. Nearest Police station is Miran sahib.

From early 2000s immigration to West and developed countries like UK, Australia, United States, Canada and New Zealand has increased. Almost one person in every family is working or studying in the above-mentioned countries.

== Geography ==
Simbal Camp is located 17 km (11 mi) south-west of Jammu. It is connected to Jammu City via Rspura Road. It was established by Mahant Raghbir Singh after 1947 partition with the help of local government. Each family was allotted a land for housing/agriculture purposes with the efforts of Mahant Raghbir Singh

Winters are cold, minimum temperature can even drop below 1 °C and summers are hot with an average temperature above 30 °C.
